Adam Okruashvili (Georgian: ადამ ოქრუაშვილი; born 1 January 1989 in Tbilisi, Georgian SSR, Soviet Union) is a Georgian judoka.

He competed at the 2012 Summer Olympics and the 2016 Olympics in the +100 kg event. Okruashvili won silver in 2013 European Judo Championships and 2014 European Judo Championships.

He won the gold medal in the 2015 European Games, defeating Israeli Or Sasson in the +100 kg category final.

References

External links
 
 
 
 
 

1989 births
Living people
Male judoka from Georgia (country)
Olympic judoka of Georgia (country)
Judoka at the 2012 Summer Olympics
Judoka at the 2016 Summer Olympics
Sportspeople from Tbilisi
Judoka at the 2015 European Games
European Games medalists in judo
European Games gold medalists for Georgia (country)
European Games silver medalists for Georgia (country)
Universiade medalists in judo
Universiade medalists for Georgia (country)
21st-century people from Georgia (country)